Badgerys Creek, a watercourse that is part of the Hawkesbury-Nepean catchment, is located in Greater Western Sydney, New South Wales, Australia.

Course and features

The creek descends  over its  course.

Etymology 
Badgery (1769-1827) had arrived in the colony in November 1799 as an emigrant in the employ of William Paterson of the New South Wales Corps. However it was this large grant of  that Badgery used to establish a farming enterprise which included property in the  region and evolved over the nineteenth century into the agricultural company Pitt Son & Badgery. Badgery named the grant Exeter Farm after his English birthplace. By 1828 the Badgery family had  of land in the colony. Essentially rural and sparsely populated throughout the nineteenth century, local government representation was forced on the area by the New South Wales Government in 1906 through the establishment of Nepean Shire. In the early 1920s, Badgery’s old grant was divided under the provisions of the Soldier Settlement Act, while in 1936 a large area with frontage to South Creek was acquired by the Commonwealth of Australia for a CSIRO research station for animal health (McMaster’s Field Station) and also for a short time was a field station for research into radio astronomy. The site was sold by the CSIRO in 1996.

See also 

 Rivers of New South Wales
 Second Sydney Airport

References 

Creeks and canals of Sydney
Hawkesbury River